A86 or A-86 may refer to:

 A86 (software), an assembler for x86 architecture microprocessors
 A86 motorway (France), a beltway in the region of Paris
 A86 road, a major road in Scotland
 Dutch Defence, in the Encyclopaedia of Chess Openings
 LOHAS Park station, a station of Hong Kong MTR